Douglas Macgregor (or McGregor or MacGregor) may refer to:

 Douglas McGregor (aviator) (1895–1953), Canadian World War I flying ace
 Douglas McGregor (1906–1964), US psychologist and professor of management
 Douglas Macgregor (born 1953), retired US military officer and author
 Doug MacGregor (born 1977), Canadian musician, drummer for Constantines